The Really Wild Show is a long-running British television show about wildlife, broadcast by the BBC as part of their CBBC service to children. It also runs on Animal Planet in the US.

The show was broadcast each year from 21 January 1986. In April 2006 the BBC announced that the show would be axed that summer, and as such the last episode was shown in May 2006, giving the show a run of 20 years.

However, in July 2017, it was announced that the BBC were in talks with Chris Packham and Michaela Strachan to bring the show back.

The theme tune used was extracts taken from the start and end of the track ELLOVEE-EE by Tony Sherman.

Presenters
Presenters have included:

Janice Acquah (1996–1999)
Steve Backshall (2004–2006)
Nick Baker (1996–2006)
Nicola Davies (1986–1990)
Sue Dawson (1990–1993)
Eils Hewitt (2002–2004)
Terry Nutkins (1986–1993)
Chris Packham (1986–1995)
Michaela Strachan (1993–2006)
Howie Watkins (1993–2000)
Dominic Wood (2001)
Chris Lambert (Co-host, 1997–2000)

Table

Transmission guide

The Really Wild Roadshow

Specials

Compilations
Wildest Hits 1 – series compilation: 10 editions from 17 April 2000 – 28 April 2000
Wildest Hits 2 – series compilation: 10 editions from 9 April 2001 – 20 April 2001

Awards
The programme has been nominated for several BAFTA awards, and won three:
1987 – Won BAFTA TV Award: Best Children's Programme (Factual)
1988 – Won BAFTA TV Award: Best Children's Programme (Documentary/Educational)
1990 –	Won BAFTA TV Award: Best Children's Programme (Documentary/Educational)
1994 – Nominated for BAFTA TV Award: Best Children's Programme (Factual)
2002 – Nominated for BAFTA Children's Award: Best Factual
2003 – Nominated for BAFTA Children's Award: Best Factual

Ratings (CBBC Channel)
Figures come from BARB

Saturday 2 March 2002– 60,000 (7th most watched on CBBC that week)
Sunday 17 March 2002– 40,000 (9th most watched on CBBC that week)
Saturday 16 March 2002– 30,000 (10th most watched on CBBC that week)
Saturday 4 May 2002– 30,000 (4th most watched on CBBC that week)

References

External links
CBBC – The Really Wild Show at bbc.co.uk

1986 British television series debuts
2006 British television series endings
Really Wild Show, The
Animal Planet original programming
1980s British children's television series
1990s British children's television series
2000s British children's television series
English-language television shows
BAFTA winners (television series)